Leila Esfandyari (February 16, 1971 in Karaj, Iran – July 22, 2011, Gasherbrum II, Pakistan) was an Iranian mountain climber. Esfandyari was the first Iranian woman to scale the summit of Nanga Parbat in the Himalayas, the world’s ninth highest peak with an altitude of 8,125 metres and one of the deadliest peaks. Esfandyari is regarded as a pioneer in the women’s mountain climbing movement, being one of few women in the world to have completed a similar attempt.

Education and career
Esfandyari was brought up and educated in Tehran, Iran, receiving a bachelor's degree in microbiology. She worked as a microbiologist in a Tehran hospital before she left her job to climb K2 in the Himalayas in 2010.

Death 
On July 22, 2011, she successfully completed the ascent to Gasherbrum II, one of the highest peaks on the Karakoram range of the Himalayas. Minutes after, on the way down, her foot slipped on the ice and she fell 300 meters down the mountain. She had said once before that: "If I fall, let me remain where I am." In accordance to her wishes, her body has remained on Gasherbum II.

Notes 

Sportspeople from Tehran
Iranian mountain climbers
Iranian sportswomen
2011 deaths
1970 births
Sport deaths in Pakistan
Mountaineering deaths
20th-century Iranian women
21st-century Iranian women